Brittonicisms in English are the linguistic effects in English attributed to the historical influence of Brittonic (i.e. British Celtic) speakers as they switched language to English following the Anglo-Saxon settlement of Britain and the establishment of Anglo-Saxon political dominance in Britain.

The research into this topic uses a variety of approaches to approximate the Romano-British language spoken in Sub-Roman Britain on the eve of the Anglo-Saxon arrival. Besides the earliest extant Old Welsh texts, Breton is useful for its lack of English influence.

The Brittonic substratum influence on English is considered to be very small, but a number of publications in the 2000s (decade) suggested that its influence may have been underestimated. Some of the developments differentiating Old English from Middle English have been proposed as an emergence of a previously unrecorded Brittonic influence.

There are many, often obscure, characteristics in English that have been proposed as Brittonicisms.  White (2004) enumerates 92 items, of which 32 are attributed to other academic works. However, these theories have not become a part of the mainstream view of the history of English.

History of research
The received view that Romano-British impact on English has been minimal on all levels became established at the beginning of the 20th century following work by such scholars as Otto Jespersen (1905) and Max Förster (1921).  Opposing views by Wolfgang Keller (1925) Ingerid Dal (1952), G. Visser (1955), Walther Preusler (1956), and by Patricia Poussa (1990) were marginal to the academic consensus of their time. Oxford philologist and author J. R. R. Tolkien expressed his suspicion of Brittonic influence and pointed out some anomalies in support of this view in his 1955 valedictory lecture English and Welsh, in which Tolkien cites Förster.

Research on Romano-British influence in English intensified in the 2000s (decade), principally centring on The Celtic Englishes programmes in Germany (Potsdam University) and The Celtic Roots of English programme in Finland (University of Joensuu).

The review of the extent of Romano-British influence has been encouraged by developments in several fields. Significant survival of Brittonic peoples in Anglo-Saxon England has become a more widely accepted idea thanks primarily to recent archaeological and genetic evidence.  According to a previously held model, the Romano-Britons of England were to a large extent exterminated or somehow pushed out of England – affecting their ability to influence language.  There is now a much greater body of research into language contact and a greater understanding of language contact types. The works of Sarah Thomason and Terrence Kaufman have been used in particular to model borrowing and language shift. The research uses investigations into varieties of “Celtic” English (that is Welsh English, Irish English, etc.) which reveal characteristics more certainly attributable to Celtic languages and also universal contact trends revealed by other varieties of English.

Old English

Diglossia model
Endorsed particularly by Hildegard Tristram (2004), the Old English diglossia model proposes that much of the native Romano-British population remained in the northern and western parts of England while the Anglo-Saxons gradually took over the rule of these regions. Over a long period, the Brittonic population imperfectly learnt the Anglo-Saxons' language while Old English continued in an artificially stable form as the written language of the elite and the only version of English preserved in writing. After the Norman conquerors removed Anglo-Saxon rule, the dialects of the general population, which would have included Brithonic and Norse-influenced versions of English, were eventually recorded and appear as Middle English.  This kind of variance between written and spoken language is attested historically in other cultures, notably Latin, and may occur commonly. For instance, Moroccan Arabic (Darija) and other colloquial varieties of Arabic have had virtually no literary presence in over a millennium; the substantial Berber substratum in Darija (and likewise, the Coptic substratum in Egyptian, etc.) would not have appeared in any significant Arabic works until the late 20th century, when Darija, along with the other varieties of Arabic, began to be written down in quantity.

The notion that such a diglossia could have existed in England, however, has been challenged by several linguists. Robert McColl Millar, for example, has pointed out that many works written in Old English, such as Ælfric's homilies, seem to be intended for a “large and undifferentiated audience,” suggesting that the language they were written in was not different from the language of the common people. He further concludes that “the idea that this state could continue for hundreds of years seems most unlikely,” noting further that no document from the time alludes to such a situation (by contrast, in Gaul, references are made to the lingua romana rustica as being different from written Latin).<ref>Robert McColl Millar, At the Forefront of Linguistic Change: The Morphology of Late Northumbrian Texts and the History of the English Language, with Particular Reference to the Lindisfarne Gospels</ref> John Insley has stated that "there is not a scrap of evidence for [a] 'Late British-derived Old English.'"

Substantive verb – consuetudinal tense byð
This claim depends on assuming that Old English is unusual as a Germanic language in its use of two forms of the verb to be; however, all other Germanic languages also exhibit the two verbs be with similar semantics, and so the evidence probably is more suggestive of a common inheritance than substratum influence – though this substratum influence could be claimed also for many parts of the European mainland, formerly Celtic but now Germanic.  The b- form is used in a habitual sense and the 3rd person singular form, byð, has the same distinction of functions and is associated with a similar phonetic form in the Brittonic *bið (Welsh bydd, Middle Breton bout, Cornish boaz). Biðun, the 3rd person plural form, is also used in Northern texts and seems to parallel the Brittonic byddant. Though the claim is made that the biðun form is particularly difficult to explain as a Germanic language construct, but is consistent with the Brittonic system, the form fits into regular Germanic to Anglian sound changes.

Transition to Middle English

Change from syntheticism towards analyticism
The development from Old English to Middle English is marked particularly by a change from syntheticism (expressing meaning using word-endings) to analyticism (expressing meaning using word order). Old English was a synthetic language, though its inflections already tended to be simpler than those of contemporary continental Germanic languages. There are different word endings for case (roughly speaking, endings for the direct object of a sentence, the subject of a sentence and similarly for two other grammatical situations (not including instrumental)) varying for plural forms, gender forms and two kinds of word form (called weak and strong). This system is partially retained in modern Germanic languages, especially German, Icelandic and Faroese. Brittonic, however, was already a highly analytic language and so Brittonic peoples may have had difficulty learning Old English. It has been suggested that the Brittonic Latin of the period demonstrates difficulty in using the Latin word endings.

Some language innovations occurred primarily in texts from Northern and South-Western England – in theory, the areas with the greater density of Brittonic people. In the Northern zone of that period, there was partial replacement of the Anglo-Saxon rule by Norse invaders. This situation can variously be seen as mitigating the emergence of Brittonic English or as the direct cause of the Northern language innovations i.e. Middle English creole hypothesis. Tristram argues that contact with both Brittonic and Norse speakers explains the language innovations in texts from Northern England. The attrition in word endings, as witnessed by the loss of the nasal endings (m,n), began before the Norse invasion.

Innovations in the Northern zone texts associated by Tristram with Brittonic influence:
Old English had case and gender word endings for nouns, pronouns and adjectives while at the time Brittonic did not have these endings. The endings in English were lost.
Old English had several versions of the word the while at the time Brittonic only had one. The variations of the were lost in English. The lack of different forms of the is an unusual language feature shared only by Celtic and English in this region.
English developed a fixed word order, which was present earlier in Brittonic

However, Millar argues that “in all of the modern Germanic languages, there has been some movement away from a synthetic towards an analytic typology ... it can therefore be suggested that the changes involved are ‘hard-wired’ in all the Germanic languages ...” He concludes that Norse is the most likely origin for the losses, based on the geographical distribution of the initial stages of change correlating strongly with Viking settlement patterns. Insley considers the native word-initial stress pattern in Old English to be a reason for the loss.

Innovations in the South Western zone texts:
Rise of the periphrastic aspect, particularly the progressive form (i.e. BE verb-ing: I am writing, she was singing etc.). The progressive form developed in the change from Old English to Middle English.  Similar constructs are rare in Germanic languages and not completely analogous. Celtic usage has chronological precedence and high usage.  Celtic Englishes employ the structure more than Standard English.  E.g. "It was meaning right the opposite", Manx English Other linguists have demonstrated that this form likely arose from two constructions that were used fairly rarely in Old and Early Middle English. The first used a form of beon/wesan (to be/to become) with a present participle (-ende). This construction has an analogous form in Dutch. The second used beon/wesan, a preposition, and a gerund (-unge), and has been variously proposed as being influenced by similar forms in Latin and French or Brittonic, though evidence one way or another is scant. Over the course of the Middle English period, sound shifts in the language meant that the (-ende) participle ending and the (-unge) gerund ending merged into a new ending, (-ing). This change, which was complete in southern England around the late fifteenth century and spread north from there, rendered participles and gerunds indistinguishable. It is at this point that a sudden increase in the use of progressive forms is visible, though they would not take their current form until the eighteenth century. Herbert Schendl has concluded that "with this feature, a polygenetic origin ... seems attractive, and at least the further extension of the progressive is a language-internal development."

Do-periphrasis in a variety of uses. Modern English is dependent on a semantically neutral 'do' in some negative statements and questions, e.g. 'I don't know' rather than 'I know not". This feature is linguistically very rare, although all West Germanic languages except Afrikaans can use "do" as an auxiliary. Celtic languages use a similar structure, but without dependence. The usage is frequent in Cornish and Middle Cornish – e.g. "Omma ny wreugh why tryge", "You do not stay here" – and it is used in Middle Breton.  "Do" is more common in Celtic Englishes than Standard English. There are, however, other theories for how this feature developed in standard English. The key difficulty in explaining this form as a Brittonicism is its late appearance in the language—arising in the fifteenth century. Thus, several linguists have proposed that it developed independently during the transition between Middle and Early Modern English..

Various possible Brittonicisms

Loss of weorþan
In Old English, a common verb weorþan existed (cognate with Dutch worden and German werden) where today motion verbs like go and went are used instead, e.g., "What shall worthe of us twoo!" This use of motion verbs occurs in Celtic texts with relative frequency e.g. "ac am hynny yd aeth Kyledyr yg gwyllt" = "and because of this Kyledyr went mad" (Middle Welsh, where aeth = 'went')..

Rise in use of some complex syntactic structures
English construction of complex sentences uses some forms which in popularity may suggest a Celtic influence. Clefting in Old Welsh literature precedes its common use in English by perhaps 400 years – depending on the dating of Welsh texts.  Cleft constructions are more common in Breton French than Standard French and more common and versatile in Celtic English than Standard English.  Clefting may be linked to the rise of a fixed word order after the loss of inflections.

Uses of himself, herself etc.
Celtic and English have formal identity between intensifier and reflexive pronoun. They share this feature only with Maltese, Finnish, Estonian and Hungarian in Europe.  In Middle English, the old intensifier "self" was replaced by a fusion of pronoun + "self" which is now used in a communication to emphasise the object in question e.g. "A woman who is conspicuously generous to others less fortunate than herself."

Northern subject rule
The Northern subject rule was the general pattern of syntax used for the present tense in northern Middle English. It occurs in some present-day dialects. The 3rd person singular verb is used for 3rd person plural subjects unless the pronoun, "they", is used and it is directly adjacent to the verb, e.g. "they sing", "they only sings", "birds sings". This anti-agreement is standard in Modern Welsh – excepting the adjacency condition. It had general usage in Old Welsh and therefore, presumably, in Cumbric. It has also been argued that this was a language-internal development that arose during the Middle English period. The lack of northern texts in Old English means that explaining the origin of the rule with any degree of certainty is difficult.

Lack of external possessor
English does not make use of the more cumbersome external possessor. The only other "European" languages without this are Lezgian, Turkish, Welsh and Breton. All other continental languages have an external possessor option or conventional usage.  An option exists in Swedish for "she washed his hair": grammatically internally: "Hon tvättade hans hår"; externally: "Hon tvättade håret på honom". In modern French this is predominant as to the reflexive (subject themselves) "elle s'est lavé les cheveux" (she washed her hair) and otherwise sometimes conventional. Old English used it such as Seo cwen het þa þæm cyninge þæt heafod of aceorfan, literally "The Queen had them the King the head to a-carve (cut off)", which mirrors modern German: Die Königin ließ sie, dem König den Kopf ab(zu)schneiden.Modern English must use an internal possessor: "The Queen ordered them to cut off the King's head".

Tag questions and answers
The statistical bias towards use of tag questions and answers in English, historically, instead of simply yes or no has been attributed to Celtic influence..  Celtic languages do not use yes and no. Answers are made by using the appropriate verb. For example, "dych chi'n hoffi siocled?/ydw, dw i'n hoffi siocled." (Welsh: 'do you like chocolate?' 'I do, I like chocolate.' More literally: 'are you liking chocolate? I am, I am liking chocolate.'). In this case, 'ydw' is not 'yes,' but rather the first-person present tense conjugation of 'fyddo,' 'to be,' that is only appropriate as the positive response to a question (the neutral or negative conjugation would be 'dwi' or 'dw i.').

Phonetics
Among the phonetic anomalies is the continued use of [w], [θ] and [ð] in Modern English (win, breath, breath''e). The use of the sounds in Germanic languages has generally been unstable and it has been posited that the continual influence of Celtic may have had a supportive effect in preserving English use. The legitimacy of this evidence has been disputed. The use of one or more of these phonemes has been preserved in other Germanic languages, such as Elfdalian, Icelandic, and some dialects of Dutch. Kenneth Jackson commented that it is “impossible to point to any feature about Anglo-Saxon phonology which can be shown conclusively to be a modification due to the alien linguistic habits of the Britons.”

See also
List of English words of Welsh origin
History of the English language
Middle English creole hypothesis
List of English words of Brittonic origin
Celtic language-death in England

References

Bibliography 

 
 
 
 
 
 

History of the English language
Language contact
Brittonic languages